Dominique Vallee (born April 9, 1981) is a Canadian snowboarder, specializing in the halfpipe and snowboard cross events.

Career
Vallee made her World Cup debut in January 1999 at Mont-Sainte-Anne, Canada, IN A 
halfpipe competition. She made her first World Cup podium in December 2001 when she won bronze in Whistler.

To date, Vallee has only a single World Cup medal, and her best World Cup season was 2003, when she placed 13th in the overall snowboard standings. She has also won a bronze medal in snowboard cross at the FIS Snowboarding World Championships, in 2001.

Vallee competed at the 2006 Winter Olympics, in both the halfpipe and snowboard cross. She finished 21st overall in the halfpipe and 19th in the qualifying round of the snowboard cross, with neither result allowing her to advance.

World Cup Podiums

References

External links
FIS profile

1981 births
Living people
Olympic snowboarders of Canada
Snowboarders at the 2006 Winter Olympics
Sportspeople from Montreal
Canadian female snowboarders
Pan American Games competitors for Canada